Fuera de la ley (English: Outside the Law) may refer to:
 Outside the Law (1937 film), Argentine thriller film
 Fuera de la ley (1964 film), Argentine Western film